Thomas George Stell (born 1991), known professionally as Golden Features, is an Australian deep house / dance DJ and producer currently signed to Warner Bros. Records. Three singles, "Tell Me" featuring Nicole Millar, "No One" featuring Thelma Plum, and "Wolfie" featuring Julia Stone; received listener's votes for the Triple J Hottest 100. They were listed, successively, at No. 101 in 2014, No. 92 in 2015, and No. 70 in 2016. Golden Features performed at the Hard festival  in 2016. His debut album, Sect (26 July 2018), reached No. 11 on the ARIA Albums Chart.

Biography 

Tom Stell has performed as Golden Features since 2014. When Peking Duk members, Adam Hyde and Reuben Styles, relocated from Canberra to Sydney they shared a house with Stell for a year. He recalled, "Those two are like my brothers and without both of their support and guidance the Golden Features project never would have seen the light of day."

Golden Features adopted a gold mask for performances and initially maintained his anonymity. He explained, "You go out, you do whatever you have to do, you put it out there in the world, and you don't expect personal credit for it. You just do it because it satisfies you... I didn't want my face plastered over things just because I prefer to have a character that I speak through." As a solo artist, he released a four-track self-titled extended play in February 2014. After he revealed his name, he observed, "it became a gimmick and people became more interested in who is making the music rather than the music itself. So I cut it off and put my face up everywhere. The initial idea was like the music speak for itself, it backfired but I stand by it."

The producer provided a remix version for the Presets' single, "No Fun" (August 2014), which made it to No. 13 on the ARIA Club Tracks. His EP provided a single, "Tell Me" featuring Nicole Millar, in the following month, which reached No. 14 on the ARIA Dance Singles and No. 7 on the ARIA Hitseekers Singles charts. It missed being listed on the Triple J Hottest 100, 2014, and was placed in the Second Hottest 100 (101–200) at No. 101.

The artist's second four-track EP, XXIV, was issued in July 2015, and reached No. 56 on the ARIA Singles Chart. The reviewer from Oz EDM felt, "[he] is known for his genre-bending signature sound (apart from his Mask)... [the EP] offers nothing short of amazing production and originality and genuinely is something for dance fans to get excited about." Its lead single, "No One" featuring Thelma Plum, peaked at No. 58 on the same chart. It was listed at No. 92 on the Triple J Hottest 100, 2015.

Included on XXIV was "Telescope" featuring K.Flay, which the reviewer noticed provided, "intriguing RnB style vocals" by Flay and "offers a somewhat new style of what we have come to expect from Golden Features. Showing light elements of trap, 'Telescope's upbeat tempo is less dark than the rest of the tracks." In 2016 he released, "Wolfie" featuring Julia Stone, which reached No. 70 in Triple J Hottest 100, 2016. Pilerats Troy Mutton described, "it proved a little surprising to some. Not the out-and-out dark and brooding banger we've come to expect from [him], rather something sweeter, less intense. It's so sweet in fact that it's named after – and features a sound byte from – his young nephew... [Stone's] twee, Australian lilt is toned down ever-so-slightly to create something that is somehow both melancholic and euphoric."

Golden Features supported Alison Wonderland on her tour of the United States in 2016 and undertook his own headlining tour of the US in February of the next year. He released his debut album, Sect, on 26 July 2018, which reached No. 11 on the ARIA Albums Chart and No. 1 on the iTunes Chart.Sect  was named a Triple J feature album, described as being an "eclectic mix of driving beats, dark choruses, blistering drops and ethereal vocals".

Golden Features appeared on the Coachella DoLab stage during the first weekend of the 2019 festival.

In July 2020 Golden Features collaborated with Odesza and released the project Bronson, the ten track album features appearances from lau.ra, Gallant, and Totally Enormous Extinct Dinosaurs.  Bronson debuted number 22 on the ARIA Albums Chart and at number 5 in the United States on Billboard's Top Dance/Electronic Albums Chart.  

In 2022, Golden Features released "Touch" and "Vigil" and toured the United States of America in September of that year.

Discography

Studio albums

Collaborative albums

Extended plays

Singles

As lead artist

Remixes

Mixes

Notes

References

1991 births
Australian musicians
Living people
Foreign Family Collective artists
Masked musicians